The Falkenstein Grand Hotel is a luxury resort in Königstein im Taunus (Falkenstein im Taunus), Germany. It was founded in 1875 as a sanatorium for officers. The current structure was completed in 1909 and opened by Kaiser Wilhelm II. It was a sanatorium until 1976 and also served as a hospital, military sanatorium and hospital for invalids before being closed in 1991. On 9 September 1999, it re-opened as a 106-room luxury hotel, the Kempinski Hotel Falkenstein Königstein Frankfurt, managed by Kempinski hotel. In 2001 The German Hotel and Restaurant Association awarded the hotel five stars. In January 2021, its management transferred from Kempinski to Marriott International's Autograph Collection division.

See also
List of hotels in Germany

External links
 Official website
 Photos of the Park surrounding the Hotel

Hotels in Germany
Hesse
Hotels established in 1999
1999 establishments in Germany
Hospitals established in 1875
1991 disestablishments in Germany
Infrastructure completed in 1909
Hotel buildings completed in 1909